Glen Charles Abbott (2 December 1969 – 8 May 1993) was a South African cricketer, who played for Griqualand West and Northern Tranvaal. He previously played for the Tshwane University of Technology cricket club.

Abbott made his first-class debut for Griqualand West in the Castle Bowl competition in December 1988. He played a further 13 matches over three seasons with Griqualand West in the Bowl. In 1992 he moved to Northern Transvaal and played three matches in the Castle Cup.

In List A, Abbott played for the Impalas in the Benson and Hedges Series from 1990 to 1992 before playing his final season the competition with Northern Transvaal. He also played in four Nissan Shield matches, a now defunct knockout competition for South Africa's provincial teams.

During the 1992 English cricket season, Abbott played six matches for Worcestershire Second XI in the Second XI Championship.

Abbott died in a road incident near Kimberley on 8 May 1993 aged 23. He was about play for Penn Cricket Club in Wolverhampton that season just before he died. A charity cricket tournament was played in his honour for many years after his death in Coventry. Abbott had played for the now folded Sphinx club in the Coventry and District League.

References

1969 births
1993 deaths
Griqualand West cricketers
Northerns cricketers
Cricketers from Kimberley, Northern Cape
Road incident deaths in South Africa
South African cricketers